Zvjezdan Radin (born 28 October 1953) is a Croatian retired football player and manager.

Career
As a player, he was part of NK Rijeka's golden generation which won the Yugoslav Cup in 1978 and 1979. He was a defender and is the second most capped Rijeka player of all time with 621 appearances in all competitions. He also scored 15 goals during his time in Rijeka as he was a prolific free kick taker. Although one of Rijeka's most talented players, he never made an appearance for the Yugoslav national team due to biases in favour of players from the "big four" (Red Star Belgrade, Partizan Belgrade, Dinamo Zagreb and Hajduk Split). Radin also played abroad in Germany with 2. Bundesliga club Kickers Offenbach in the 1984–85 season.

After retiring as a player at the age of 38, Radin became a coach and has managed HNK Rijeka during the 1994–95 season. Currently, he is the head of Rijeka's youth school.

Honours
NK Rijeka
Yugoslav Cup: 1978, 1979
Balkans Cup: 1978

Individual
NK Rijeka's all time XI by: Novi list: 2011

Career statistics

As a player

Managerial statistics

References

External links
 

1953 births
Living people
Footballers from Rijeka
Association football defenders
Yugoslav footballers
HNK Rijeka players
Kickers Offenbach players
NK Zadar players
Yugoslav First League players
2. Bundesliga players
Yugoslav expatriate footballers
Expatriate footballers in West Germany
Yugoslav expatriate sportspeople in West Germany
Croatian football managers
HNK Rijeka managers
HNK Rijeka non-playing staff